28 Days may refer to:

 28 Days (band), an Australian punk rock band
 28 Days (album), the debut album of the band
 "28 Days", the title song from the album
 28 Days (film), a 2000 American comedy-drama film
 28 Days, the accompanying film score by Richard Gibbs
 "28 Days", a song by Bob Gentry
 "28 Days", a song by Sponge from For All the Drugs in the World (2003)
 "Twenty-Eight Days", a song by LFO from Life Is Good (2001)
 "28 Days: A Novel of Resistance in the Warsaw Ghetto", a book  by David Safier (2020)

See also
 28 Days Later, a 2002 British post-apocalyptic horror film 
 28 Days Later: The Soundtrack Album, the accompanying soundtrack by John Murphy